An image is an artifact that depicts visual perception, such as a photograph or other two-dimensional picture.

Image or IMAGE may also refer to:

Arts, entertainment and media

Media brands and companies
 Image, an imprint of Crown Publishing Group
 Image Channel, a Nepali television channel
 Image Comics, an American comic book company
 Image Entertainment, a home video and television distribution company

Music
 Image (album), a 1992 album by Luna Sea
 Images (Lucio Battisti album), 1977
 An Image: Lee Konitz with Strings, a 1958 album by Lee Konitz
 "Image", a song by P.O.D. on the album The Fundamental Elements of Southtown
 Images pour orchestre, an orchestral composition in three sections by Claude Debussy
 Images (composition), a suite of six compositions for solo piano by Claude Debussy

Literature
 Image (journal), an American quarterly literary journal
 Image (magazine), an Irish lifestyle and fashion magazine
 Image (Finnish magazine), a Finnish lifestyle and cultural magazine
 Image (Angel novel), a 2002 original novel based on the U.S. television series Angel

Film
 Images (1972 film), a film by Robert Altman

Other uses in arts, entertainment and media
 Image (board game), a 1972 board game by 3M

Science and technology

Computing
 Card image, a character string that was, or could be, contained on a single punched card
 Disk image, a computer file containing the complete contents and structure of a data storage device
 Executable, a computer file containing an executable program; short for "executable program image"
 Image file formats, standardized means of storing digital images
 ISO image, an archive file (disk image) of an optical disc
 RAM image, a sequence of machine code instructions kept on ROM and moved to the RAM for use
 ROM image, a computer file which contains a copy of the data from a read-only memory chip
 Single system image, a cluster of computers that appear to be a single computing system
 System image, the state of a computer or software system stored in some form
 Tape image, an image of the contents of a computer's magnetic tape
 IMAGE (database), a network database program for the HP 3000 systems

Mathematics
 Image (category theory), a generalization of the image of a function
 Image (mathematics), subset of a function's codomain
 Image (matrix), or column space of a matrix

Optics
 Digital image, a discrete representation of a picture as used in computing
 Mirror image, a virtual image "behind" a mirror
 Photograph, an image created by light falling on a light-sensitive surface or an electronic imager
 Real image, an image formed by rays of light that intersect at the image, as in a camera or eye
 Virtual image, an image formed by rays that do not intersect at the image

Other uses in science and technology
 IMAGE (spacecraft), a NASA spacecraft that observed the Earth's magnetosphere 2000–2005
 Image frequency, an undesired input frequency in radio reception

Other uses
 Selwyn Image (1849–1930), English clergyman, designer of stained glass windows, and poet
 Mental image, a picture in one's mind
 Reputation, a social evaluation of a person

See also
 Images (disambiguation)
 Spitting Image (disambiguation)
 Computer-generated imagery
 Digital imaging
 Imagery
 Painting